Daniele Cilli (born March 19, 1988 in Barletta) is an Italian professional football player currently playing for Lega Pro Seconda Divisione team F.C. Igea Virtus Barcellona on loan from A.S. Bari.

External links
 

1988 births
Living people
Italian footballers
A.S. Noicattaro Calcio players
Association football goalkeepers